Gas phase ion chemistry is a field of science encompassed within both chemistry and physics. It is the science that studies ions and molecules in the gas phase, most often enabled by some form of mass spectrometry. By far the most important applications for this science is in studying the thermodynamics and kinetics of reactions. For example, one application is in studying the thermodynamics of the solvation of ions. Ions with small solvation spheres of 1, 2, 3... solvent molecules can be studied in the gas phase and then extrapolated to bulk solution.

Theory

Transition state theory

Transition state theory is the theory of the rates of elementary reactions which assumes a special type of chemical equilibrium (quasi-equilibrium) between reactants and activated complexes.

RRKM theory

RRKM theory is used to compute simple estimates of the unimolecular ion decomposition reaction rates from a few characteristics of the potential energy surface.

Gas phase ion formation
The process of converting an atom or molecule into an ion by adding or removing charged particles such as electrons or other ions can occur in the gas phase. These processes are an important component of gas phase ion chemistry.

Associative ionization

Associative ionization is a gas phase reaction in which two atoms or molecules interact to form a single product ion.

where species A with excess internal energy (indicated by the asterisk) interacts with B to form the ion AB+.

One or both of the interacting species may have excess internal energy.

Charge-exchange ionization

Charge-exchange ionization (also called charge-transfer ionization) is a gas phase reaction between an ion and a neutral species 

in which the charge of the ion is transferred to the neutral.

Chemical ionization

In chemical ionization, ions are produced through the reaction of ions of a reagent gas with other species. Some common reagent gases include:  methane, ammonia, and isobutane.

Chemi-ionization

Chemi-ionization can be represented by

where G is the excited state species (indicated by the superscripted asterisk), and M is the species that is ionized by the loss of an electron to form the radical cation (indicated by the superscripted "plus-dot").

Penning ionization

Penning ionization refers to the interaction between a gas-phase excited-state atom or molecule G* and a target molecule M resulting in the formation of a radical molecular cation M+., an electron e−, and a neutral gas molecule G:

Penning ionization occurs when the target molecule has an ionization potential lower than the internal energy of the excited-state atom or molecule. Associative Penning ionization can also occur:

Fragmentation
There are many important dissociation reactions that take place in the gas phase.

Collision-induced dissociation

CID (also called collisionally activated dissociation - CAD) is a method used to fragment molecular ions in the gas phase. The molecular ions collide with neutral gas molecules such as helium, nitrogen or argon. In the collision some of the kinetic energy is converted into internal energy which results in fragmentation.

Charge remote fragmentation

Charge remote fragmentation is a type of covalent bond breaking that occurs in a gas phase ion in which the cleaved bond is not adjacent to the location of the charge.

Charge transfer reactions
There are several types of charge-transfer reactions (also known as charge-permutation reactions):  partial-charge transfer

,

charge-stripping reaction

,

and charge-inversion reaction positive to negative

and negative to positive

.

Applications
Pairwise interactions between alkali metal ions and amino acids, small peptides and nucleobases have been studied theoretically in some detail.

See also
Adiabatic ionization
Mass-analyzed ion kinetic energy spectrometry
Plasma (physics)
Michael T. Bowers
R. Graham Cooks
Helmut Schwarz

References

Bibliography

Fundamentals of gas phase ion chemistry, Keith R. Jennings (ed.), Dordrecht, Boston, Kluwer Academic, 1991, pp. 226–8
Gas Phase Ion Chemistry, Michael T. Bowers, ed., Academic Press, New York, 1979
Gas Phase Ion Chemistry Vol 2.; Bowers, M.T., Ed.; Academic Press: New York, 1979
Gas Phase Ion Chemistry Vol 3., Michael T. Bowers, ed., Academic Press, New York, 1983

External links
 http://webbook.nist.gov/chemistry/ion/

Mass spectrometry